Zamia soconuscensis is a species of plant in the family Zamiaceae. It is endemic to the Soconusco Mountains of Chiapas, Mexico. It is threatened by habitat loss. About 5,000 individuals remain in the wild.

References

soconuscensis
Endemic flora of Mexico
Flora of Chiapas
Taxonomy articles created by Polbot